This article contains a List of Facilities of the British Commonwealth Air Training Plan (BCATP) in Canada.  The BCATP was a major program for training Allied air crews during World War II that was administered by the Government of Canada, and commanded by the Royal Canadian Air Force with the assistance of a board of representatives from the United Kingdom, Australia, New Zealand and Canada.

Schools and facilities were set up at 231 locations across Canada.
Many of these facilities were airfields. In December 1939 the Canadian government identified 24 existing airfields that could be used, leaving 80 new ones to be built. Classroom facilities with residences were commandeered from universities, colleges, and other provincial institutions. Basic training facilities were commandeered from private schools and municipal governments. These "borrowed" facilities were augmented with new construction as required.

Planning and operation of facilities
There were four phases to the acquisition, construction, and operation of BCATP facilities:

the beginning as specified in the Riverdale Agreement of 17 December 1939
an expansion as a result of the move of RAF facilities to Canada starting in July 1940

An example of this is the Elementary Flying Training School at De Winton, Alberta. It began as a transplanted RAF school run by RAF personnel. It opened on 18 June 1941 as No. 31 EFTS. On 13 July 1942 it was taken over by the Toronto Flying Club under contract to the RCAF.
 an expansion as a result of the Ottawa conference of May and June 1942
 closures as a result of the decision to begin winding down in November 1943 and terminate the plan on 29 March 1945

BCATP activities were managed through four Training Commands. Each command was responsible for activities in a region of Canada:

No. 1 Toronto, Ontario,  covered southern Ontario
No. 2 Winnipeg, Manitoba, covered northwestern Ontario, all of Manitoba, and part of Saskatchewan
No. 3 Montreal, Quebec, covered Quebec and the Maritimes
No. 4 Regina, Saskatchewan, covered most of Saskatchewan, and all of Alberta and British Columbia: moved to Calgary, Alberta, in October 1941

Manning Depots
Trainees began their military careers at a Manning Depot where they learned to bathe, shave, shine boots, polish buttons, maintain their uniforms, and otherwise behave in the required manner.  There were two hours of physical education every day and instruction in marching, rifle drill, foot drill, saluting, and other routines.

Remedial high school education was offered to bring 17- and 18-year-old trainees up to the RCAF academic level. There was also a standard aptitude test: the RCAF Classification Test.

After four or five weeks, a selection committee decided whether the trainee would be placed in the aircrew or groundcrew stream. Aircrew "Wireless Air Gunner" candidates went directly to a Wireless School.  "Air Observer" and "Pilot" aircrew candidates went to an Initial Training School.

Trainees were often assigned "tarmac duty" to keep busy. Some were sent to factories to count nuts and bolts; others were sent to flying schools and other RCAF facilities to guard things, clean things, paint things, and polish things. Tarmac duty could last several months or more.

The No. 1 Manning Depot in Toronto was the Coliseum Building on the Canadian National Exhibition grounds, which accommodated up to 5,000 personnel.

No. 1 Toronto, Ontario
No 1a Picton, Ontario
No. 2 Brandon, Manitoba, moved to Swift Current, Saskatchewan
No. 2a Penhold, Alberta
No. 3 Edmonton, Alberta
No. 4 Quebec City, Quebec
No. 5 Lachine, Quebec
No. 6 Toronto, Ontario,  (Women's Division, October 1941 – May 1942)
No. 7 Rockcliffe, Ontario (Women's Division, Fall 1942)
No. 8 Souris, Manitoba (4 January 1943-1 June 1943)

Aircrew training facilities

Initial Training Schools

Pilot and Air Observer candidates began their 26- or 28-week training program with four weeks at an Initial Training School (ITS).   They studied theoretical subjects and were subjected to a variety of tests. Theoretical studies included navigation, theory of flight, meteorology, duties of an officer, air force administration, algebra, and trigonometry. Tests included an interview with a psychiatrist, the 4 hour long M2 physical examination, a session in a decompression chamber, and a "test flight" in a Link Trainer as well as academics. At the end of the course the postings were announced. Occasionally candidates were re-routed to the Wireless Air Gunner stream at the end of ITS.

No. 1 Eglinton Hunt Club, Toronto, Ontario
No. 2 Regina College & Regina Normal School, Regina, Saskatchewan
No. 3 Sacred Heart College, Victoriaville, Quebec
No. 4 Edmonton Normal School, Edmonton, Alberta
No. 5 Ontario Provincial School for the Deaf, Belleville, Ontario
No. 6 Toronto Board of Education, Toronto, Ontario
No. 7 Saskatoon Normal School & Bedford Road Collegiate, Saskatoon, Saskatchewan

Elementary Flying Training Schools

An Elementary Flying Training School (EFTS) gave a trainee 50 hours of basic flying instruction on a simple trainer like the De Havilland Tiger Moth, Fleet Finch, or Fairchild Cornell over 8 weeks.   Elementary schools were operated by civilian flying clubs under contract to the RCAF and most of the instructors were civilians. For example, No. 12 EFTS Goderich was run by the Kitchener-Waterloo Flying Club and the County of Huron Flying Club.   The next step for a pilot was the Service Flying Training School.

No. 1 Malton, Ontario (Moth)
No. 2 Fort William, Ontario (Moth)
No. 3 London, Ontario (Finch)
No. 4 Windsor Mills, Quebec, (Finch and Moth) at Saint-François-Xavier-de-Brompton, Quebec Picture 
No. 5 Lethbridge, Alberta, moved to High River, Alberta (Moth and Cornell)
No. 6 Prince Albert, Saskatchewan (Moth and Cornell)
No. 7 Windsor, Ontario (Finch, Cornell)
No. 8 Vancouver, British Columbia (Moth)
No. 9 St. Catharines, Ontario (Moth)
No. 10 Hamilton, Ontario, moved to Pendleton, Ontario (Moth, Finch and Cornell at Pendleton) 
No. 11 Cap-de-la-Madeleine, Quebec (Finch and Cornell)
No. 12 Goderich, Ontario (Finch)
No. 13 St. Eugene, Ontario(Finch, Cornell) 
No. 14 Portage la Prairie, Manitoba (Moth and Finch)
No. 15 Regina, Saskatchewan (Moth and Cornell)
No. 16 Edmonton, Alberta (Moth and Finch)
No. 17 Stanley, Nova Scotia (Finch and Moth)
No. 18 Boundary Bay, British Columbia (Moth) 
No. 19 Virden, Manitoba (Moth and Cornell) 
No. 20 Oshawa, Ontario (Moth, Cornell)
No. 21 Chatham, New Brunswick (Finch)
No. 22 L'Ancienne-Lorette, Quebec (Finch)
No. 23 Davidson, Saskatchewan, moved to Yorkton, Saskatchewan; operated by the RCAF. (Cornell)
No. 24 Abbotsford, British Columbia (Cornell)
No. 25 Assiniboia, Saskatchewan; originally No. 34 RAF (Cornell)
No. 26 Neepawa, Manitoba; originally No. 35 RAF (Moth)
No. 31 DeWinton, Alberta (Moth, Stearman and Cornell)
No. 32 Bowden, Alberta (Moth, Stearman and Cornell) 
No. 33 Caron, Saskatchewan (Cornell) 
No. 34 Assiniboia, Saskatchewan (Moth, Cornell)
No. 35 Neepawa, Manitoba (Moth and Cornell) 
No. 36 Pearce, Alberta (Moth and Stearman)

Service Flying Training Schools

Graduates of the EFTS "learn-to-fly" program went on a Service Flying Training School (SFTS) for 16 weeks. For the first 8 weeks the trainee was part of an intermediate training squadron; for the next 6 weeks an advanced training squadron and for the final 2 weeks training was conducted at a Bombing & Gunnery School.   The Service schools were military establishments run by the RCAF or the RAF.

There were two different types of Service Flying Training Schools. Trainees in the fighter pilot stream went to an SFTS like No. 14 Aylmer, where they trained in the North American Harvard or North American Yale. Trainees in the bomber, coastal or transport pilot stream went to an SFTS like No. 5 Brantford where they learned multi-engine technique in an Airspeed Oxford, Avro Anson or Cessna Crane.

No. 1 Camp Borden, Ontario (Harvard and Yale)
No. 2 Uplands, Ontario (Harvard and Yale)
No. 3 Calgary, Alberta (Anson and Crane)
No. 4 Saskatoon, Saskatchewan (Anson and Crane)
No. 5 Brantford, Ontario (Anson)
No. 6 Dunnville, Ontario (Harvard and Yale)
No. 7 Fort MacLeod, Alberta (Anson) 
No. 8 Moncton, New Brunswick (Anson and Harvard)
No. 9 Summerside, Prince Edward Island, moved to Centralia, Ontario (Anson and Harvard)
No. 10 Dauphin, Manitoba (Harvard and Crane)
No. 11 Yorkton, Saskatchewan (Harvard, Crane and Anson)
No. 12 Brandon, Manitoba (Crane and Anson)
No. 13 St. Hubert, Quebec, moved to North Battleford, Saskatchewan (Harvard and Anson)
No. 14 Aylmer, Ontario (Anson, Harvard, Yale, and Supermarine Walrus)
No. 15 Claresholm, Alberta (Anson)
No. 16 Hagersville, Ontario (Anson and Harvard) 
No. 17 Souris, Manitoba (Anson and Harvard)
No. 18 Gimli, Manitoba (Anson and Harvard)
No. 19 Vulcan, Alberta (Anson)
No. 31 Kingston, Ontario (Battle and Harvard)
No. 32 Moose Jaw, Saskatchewan (Havard and Oxford)
No. 33 Carberry, Manitoba (Anson)
No. 34 Medicine Hat, Alberta (Harvard and Oxford)
No. 35 North Battleford, Saskatchewan (Oxford)
No. 36 Penhold, Alberta (Oxford)
No. 37 Calgary, Alberta (Oxford, Harvard and Anson)
No. 38 Estevan, Saskatchewan (Anson)
No. 39 Swift Current, Saskatchewan (Oxford)
No. 41 Weyburn, Saskatchewan (Anson and Harvard)

Air Observer Schools

 
Air Observers were later called "navigators".  For recruits in this stream, the training path after ITS was 8 weeks at an Air Observer School (AOS), 1 month at a Bombing & Gunnery School, and finally 1 month at a Navigation School. The Air Observer schools were operated by civilians under contract to the RCAF. For example, Nos. 7, 8, and 9 were run by CP Airlines. However, the instructors were RCAF. The basic navigation techniques throughout the war years were dead reckoning and visual pilotage, and the tools were the aeronautical chart, magnetic compass, watch, trip log, pencil, Douglas protractor, and Dalton Navigational Computer. They trained in the Avro Anson.

No. 1 Malton, Ontario
No. 2 Edmonton, Alberta
No. 3 Regina, Saskatchewan, moved to Pearce, Alberta
No. 4 London, Ontario
No. 5 Winnipeg, Manitoba
No. 6 Prince Albert, Saskatchewan
No. 7 Portage la Prairie, Manitoba
No. 8 L'Ancienne-Lorette, Quebec (No. 8 AOS BCATP)
No. 9 Saint-Jean-sur-Richelieu, Quebec
No. 10 Chatham, New Brunswick

Bombing and Gunnery Schools
 
The Bombing and Gunnery School (B&GS) offered instruction in the techniques of bomb aiming and aerial machine gunnery to Air Observers, Bomb Aimers, and Wireless Air Gunners. These schools required large areas to accommodate their bombing and gunnery ranges, and were often located near water. The Avro Anson, Fairey Battle, Bristol Bolingbroke, and Westland Lysander were the standard aircraft used at B&GS schools.

No. 1 Jarvis, Ontario
No. 2 Mossbank, Saskatchewan 
No. 3 Macdonald, Manitoba 
No. 4 Fingal, Ontario 
No. 5 Dafoe, Saskatchewan 
No. 6 Mountain View, Ontario
No. 7 Paulson, Manitoba 
No. 8 Lethbridge, Alberta
No. 9 Mont-Joli, Quebec
No. 10 Mount Pleasant, Prince Edward Island
No. 31 Picton, Ontario

Air Navigation Schools
Nos. 1 & 2 Air Navigation Schools offered four-week courses in astronavigation and were the last step for Air Observers. The RAF schools, Nos. 31, 32, and 33, provided the same training as Air Observer Schools.

No. 1 Trenton, Ontario moved to Rivers, Manitoba and redesignated Central Navigation School
No. 2 Pennfield Ridge, New Brunswick (Anson) 
No. 31 Port Albert, Ontario (Anson) 
No. 32 Charlottetown, Prince Edward Island
No. 33 Hamilton, Ontario (Anson)
No. 2 Charlottetown, Prince Edward Island

Wireless Schools

Trainees in the "Wireless Air Gunner" (WAG) stream spent 24 weeks at a Wireless School learning the theory and application of wireless communications. This included signalling with lights and flags as well as radio. Their "WAG" training was completed with four weeks at a Bombing & Gunnery School.

No. 1 Montreal, Quebec moved to Mount Hope, Ontario (Norseman, Moth, Stinson 105)
No. 2 Calgary, Alberta (Harvard and Fort)
No. 3 Winnipeg, Manitoba (Moth, Stinson 105)
No. 4 Guelph, Ontario (Moth)

Naval Air Gunner School
No. 1 Yarmouth, Nova Scotia (Swordfish)

Flight Engineers' School
The flight engineer was the member of a heavy bomber aircrew responsible for monitoring the fuel, electrical systems and the engines. He also controlled the throttle settings and was the pilot's "assistant". Flight engineers were not co-pilots but they had some flying training and
were expected to be able to take over the controls in the event the pilot was killed or disabled.
 
No. 1 Aylmer, Ontario (Halifax)

General Reconnaissance Schools
The General Reconnaissance School trained pilots and air observers in the techniques required for ocean patrol. It was the equivalent to an Operational Training Unit (OTU), and last stop before aircrew were assigned to operations.  The topics included DR Navigation, Astro Navigation, Compasses and Instruments, Meteorology, Signals, Reconnaissance, Coding, Ship Recognition, Aerial Photography, and Visual Signals. Flight Lieutenant (F/L) R. E. MacBride from No. 162 (BR) Squadron RCAF trained at No. 1 GR.

Aircrew spent nine weeks at a General Reconnaissance School.

No. 1 General Reconnaissance School RCAF (Summerside, Prince Edward Island) (Anson)
No. 31 Charlottetown, Prince Edward Island (Anson)

Operational Training Units

The Operational Training Unit (OTU) was the last stop for aircrew trainees.  They spent 8 to 14 weeks learning to fly operational aircraft (Hawker Hurricane or Fairey Swordfish, e.g.). The instructors had experience in actual operations, and often were posted to OTUs after their operational tour.

No. 1 Bagotville, Quebec (Hurricane)
No. 3 Patricia Bay, British Columbia (Canso, Catalina)
No. 5 Boundary Bay, British Columbia and Abbotsford, British Columbia (Consolidated B-24 Liberator, North American Mitchell)
No. 31 Debert, Nova Scotia redesignated No. 7 OTU (Lockheed Hudson, de Havilland Mosquito, Anson)
No. 32 Patricia Bay, British Columbia moved to Comox, British Columbia and redesignated No. 6 OTU and moved to Greenwood, Nova Scotia  (Bristol Beaufort, Handley Page Hampden, Swordfish, Anson)
No. 34 Pennfield Ridge, New Brunswick  (Ventura) 
No. 36 Greenwood, Nova Scotia redesignated No. 8 OTU (Hudson, Mosquito)

Central Flying School
The Central Flying School was located at Trenton, Ontario.

Central Navigation School
The Central Navigation School was located at Rivers, Manitoba (Anson).

Instrument Navigation School
The Instrument Navigation School was located near Deseronto, Ontario.

Flying Instructor Schools
No. 1 Trenton, Ontario
No. 2 Vulcan, Alberta, moved to Pearce, Alberta
No. 3 Arnprior, Ontario

Aircrew Graduates Training Schools
The Aircrew Graduates Training School (AGTS) was established in January 1944 and was usually the last stop for aircrew prior to transfer to operational units overseas. The instructors were normally issued from the ranks of the Army. Aircrew graduates spent 3 weeks learning survival and evasion techniques that would prove useful if shot down behind enemy lines. The training included self defence, living off the land, evasion techniques and ground navigation.

No. 1 Maitland, Nova Scotia
No. 2 Quebec City, later transferred to Calgary, Alberta
No. 3 Three Rivers, Quebec
No. 4 Valleyfield, Quebec

Relief landing fields

Every principal airfield (e.g. EFTS or SFTS) had one or two relief airfields located within 10–15 km. The No. 1 Relief Airfield is called "R1" in RCAF Station diaries.  Some of the relief fields were paved, some were just grass, and some had hangars, barracks, and maintenance facilities. For example, trainees at No. 14 SFTS Aylmer moved to their R1 at Yarmouth Centre for the last four weeks of their course (radio, bombing, and gunnery).

Airdrie, Alberta – R1 for No. 3 SFTS Calgary
Alliston, Ontario – R2 for No. 1 SFTS Camp Borden 
Blackfalds, Alberta – R2 for No. 36 SFTS Penhold 
Boharm, Saskatchewan – R1 for No. 33 EFTS Caron 
Brada, Saskatchewan – R2 for No. 15 EFTS Regina
Brora, Saskatchewan – R1 for No. 35 and No. 13 SFTF North Battleford
Burtch, Ontario – R1 for No. 5 SFTS Brantford and principal field for No. 4 Wireless School Guelph. 
Buttress, Saskatchewan – R1 for No. 32 SFTS Moose Jaw 
Carp, Ontario – R1 for No. 2 SFTS Ottawa 

Cayuga, Ontario – R1 for No. 16 SFTS Hagersville
Champion, Alberta – R2 for No. 19 SFTS Vulcan
Chandler, Saskatchewan – Relief for No. 38 SFTS Estevan

Chater, Manitoba – R1 for No. 12 SFTS Brandon 
Douglas, Manitoba – R2 for No.12 SFTS Brandon
Chicoutimi, Quebec – R1 for No. 1 OTU Bagotville
Dufferin, Ontario – Relief for No. 16 SFTS Hagersville 
Eden, Manitoba – R1 for No. 35 EFTS Neepawa 
Edenvale, Ontario – R1 for No. 1 SFTS Camp Borden
Edwards, Ontario – Relief for No. 2 SFTS Ottawa 
Elgin, Manitoba – R2 for No. 17 SFTS Souris
Ensign, Alberta – R1 for No. 19 SFTS Vulcan
Farnham, Quebec – R2 for No. 13 SFTS St. Hubert 
Frank Lake, Alberta – Relief for No. 5 EFTS High River
Gananoque – R1 for No. 31 SFTS Kingston 
Grand Bend, Ontario – R1 for No. 9 SFTS Centralia
Goderich South – Relief for No. 12 EFTS Goderich 

Gladys, Alberta – R2 for No. 31 EFTS DeWinton
Granum, Alberta – R1 for No. 7 SFTS Fort MacLeod 

Halbrite, Saskatchewan – R1 for No. 41 SFTS Weyburn
Hamlin, Saskatchewan – R1 for No. 35 SFTS North Battleford
Hartney, Manitoba – R1 for No. 17 SFTS Souris 
Hawkesbury, Ontario – Relief for No. 13 EFTS St. Eugene 
Holsom, Alberta – Relief for No. 34 SFTS Medicine Hat
Innisfail, Alberta – R1 for No. 36 SFTS Penhold 
Inverlake, Alberta – R2 for No. 3 SFTS Calgary
Langley, British Columbia – Relief for No. 18 EFTS Boundary Bay
Limoges, Ontario – Relief for No. 10 EFTS Pendleton 
Maitland, Nova Scotia – Relief for No. 31 OTU Debert 
Maurice, Quebec – Relief for No. 11 EFTS Cap-de-la-Madelaine 
Mount Pleasant, Prince Edward Island – R1 for No. 9 SFTS Summerside 
Netley, Manitoba – R1 for No. 18 SFTS Gimli 
Netook, Alberta – R1 for No. 32 EFTS Bowden 
North Junction, Manitoba – Relief for No. 10 SFTS Dauphin 
Oberon, Manitoba – R2 for No. 33 SFTS Carberry
Osler, Saskatchewan – R2 for No. 4 SFTS Saskatoon 
Outram, Saskatchewan – Relief for No. 38 SFTS Estevan
Petrel, Manitoba – R1 for No. 33 SFTS Carberry 
Pontiac, Quebec – Relief for No. 3 FIS Arnprior 
Pulteney, Alberta – R2 for No. 15 SFTS Claresholm
Ralph, Saskatchewan – R2 for No. 41 SFTS Weyburn
Rhein, Saskatchewan – R2 for No. 11 SFTS Yorkton 
St. Aldwyn, Saskatchewan – R1 for No. 39 SFTS Swift Current. 
St. Honoré, Quebec – Relief for No. 1 OTU Bagotville 
St. Joseph, Ontario – Relief for No. 9 SFTS Centralia 
St. Thomas, Ontario – R1 for No. 14 SFTS Aylmer and No. 4 B&GS Fingal
Salisbury, New Brunswick – R2 for No. 8 SFTS Moncton 
Sandhurst, Ontario – R2 for No. 31 SFTS Kingston 
Scoudouc, New Brunswick – R1 for No. 8 SFTS Moncton
Shepard, Alberta – R1 for No. 31 EFTS DeWinton
Sturdee, Saskatchewan – R1 for No. 11 SFTS Yorkton 
Tillsonburg, Ontario – R2 for No. 14 SFTS Aylmer
Valley River, Manitoba – Relief for No. 10 SFTS Dauphin
Vanscoy, Saskatchewan – R1 for No. 4 SFTS Saskatoon. 
Waterville, Nova Scotia – Relief for No. 8 OTU Greenwood 
Welland, Ontario – R1 for No. 6 SFTS Dunnville
Wellington, Prince Edward Island – Relief for No. 1 GRS Summerside 
Whitby, Ontario – Relief for No. 20 EFTS Oshawa 
Whitla, Alberta – Relief for No. 34 SFTS Medicine Hat
Willoughby, Ontario – Relief for No. 9 EFTS St. Catharines 
Woodhouse, Alberta – R1 No. 15 SFTS

Groundcrew training facilities

Air Armament School Mountain View, Ontario
No. 1 Radio Direction Finding (Radar) School Leaside, Ontario
No. 31 Radio Direction Finding (Radar) School Clinton, Ontario, later RCAF No. 5
School of Cookery Guelph, Ontario
No. 1 Code and Cypher School Guelph, Ontario
No. 1 Technical Training School St. Thomas, Ontario

Support facilities
No. 1 Test Kitchen Guelph, Ontario
No. 1 Nutritional Laboratory Guelph, Ontario
No. 6 Repair Depot Trenton, Ontario
No. 8 Repair Depot Winnipeg, Manitoba

See also
 List of British Commonwealth Air Training Plan facilities in Australia
 List of British Commonwealth Air Training Plan facilities in South Africa
 List of British Commonwealth Air Training Plan facilities in Southern Rhodesia

References

Notes

Citations

Bibliography

 Dunmore, Spencer. Wings for Victory. Toronto: McClelland & Stewart, 1994. .
 Hatch, F. J. Aerodrome of Democracy: Canada and the British Commonwealth Air Training Plan 1939–1945. Ottawa: Canadian Department of National Defence, 1983. .
  Hewer, H. In for a Penny, In for a Pound: the Adventures and Misadventures of a Wireless Operator in Bomber Command. Toronto: Stoddart, 2000 .
 Lougheed, E. C. "No. 4 Wireless School At Guelph, 1941-1945.". Archival and Special Collections, University of Guelph, RE1 UOG A1642, 2002.
 McIntyre, "Mac", M.). "The Aylmer Story 14 S.F.T.S.". In Wilkinson, Les. I'll Never Forget ... Canadian Aviation In The Second World War. Willowdale, Ontario: Canadian Aviation Historical Society, 1979. .
 Milberry, Larry. Aviation in Canada: Evolution of an Air Force. Toronto: CANAV Books, 2010. .
 Scherer, J. L., F/O RCAF. "Canada's Part In The War". Flying Aces Magazine (New York: Magazine Publishers, Inc.), April 1941.
 Stewart, G. "Night Intruder". in Wilkinson, Les. I'll Never Forget'...'Canadian Aviation In The Second World War. Willowdale, Ontario: Canadian Aviation Historical Society, 1979. .
 Wikene, I. "Canso & Catalina In The R.C.A.F". in Wilkinson, Les, ed. I'll Never Forget ... Canadian Aviation In The Second World War. Willowdale, Ontario: Canadian Aviation Historical Society. 1979. .
 Ziegler, M. We Serve That Men May Fly. Hamilton, Ontario: R.C.A.F. (W.D.) Association, 1973.

External links
 Aeronautical Charts from the 1940s 
 Graves of BCATP Casualties in Canada
 Royal Canadian Air Force BCATP site list
 Station Magazines
 WWII Air Training Sites in Huron County
 RCAF.Info

British D
Aviation in Canada
Canada
Lists of airports in Canada
World War II sites in Canada
Military history of Canada during World War II
Canada history-related lists
Canadian military-related lists
Military units and formations of the British Empire in World War II